The Derkul is a left tributary of the Donets located in the Luhansk Oblast of northeast Ukraine, on the border to the Rostov Oblast of Russia.

The Derkul rises north of Markivka in the Ukrainian Luhansk Oblast on the western foothills of the Central Russian Upland. It flows mainly in a southerly direction through a hilly plain in the northeast of the oblast and after 163 km flows on the left into the Siverskyi Donets. In parts of the lower course, it forms a border of the Rostov Oblast of Russia. The Derkul flows through the urban-type settlement of Bilovodsk at the lower reaches. The most important tributary of the Derkul is the Polnaya from the left.

References

Rivers of Luhansk Oblast
Rivers of Rostov Oblast